The Philippines–Australia basketball brawl occurred between players of the Philippine and Australian men's national basketball teams during a match held on 2 July 2018 at the Philippine Arena in Bocaue, Bulacan, Philippines. The match was part of the International Basketball Federation's (FIBA) 2019 Basketball World Cup Asian qualification process.

The brawl during the third quarter caused a delay of more than thirty minutes, resulting in the ejection of four Australian players and nine Filipino players. The game was resumed briefly before two of the three remaining Filipino players intentionally fouled out, meaning the Philippines lost by default.

FIBA imposed sanctions on both sides. Suspensions were given to ten Filipino players (for a maximum of six games) and three Australian players (maximum of five games), along with the Philippines' head coach and assistant coach; both national federations were fined. The three referees who officiated at the match were suspended for a year. 

Despite the brawl, both Australia and the Philippines advanced to the second round of the 2019 FIBA Basketball World Cup Asian qualifiers. The Philippine national team was ordered to play their next home match in the second round of the qualifiers behind closed doors, with the succeeding two home games being placed under probation. The brawl also played a part in their withdrawal from the 2018 Asian Games, a decision that was later reversed. Both teams managed to qualify for the 2019 FIBA Basketball World Cup in China.

Background

Road to 2019 FIBA Basketball World Cup
For the 2019 FIBA Basketball World Cup, members of International Basketball Federation's (FIBA) Asia and Oceania confederations participated in one qualification process. For the first round of the joint Asia and Oceania qualifiers, the Philippines and Australia were drawn part of Group B along with Chinese Taipei and Japan.

The Philippines and Australia first played against each other in the qualifiers in Melbourne, Victoria, Australia. The home side, Australia won over the visitors 84–68. Prior to the start of their second face off, this time in Bocaue, Bulacan, Philippines, the two teams had already qualified for the second round of the FIBA Basketball World Cup qualifiers.

The last FIBA Basketball World Cup qualifier match of the Philippines prior to their second match-up against Australia was against Chinese Taipei, away from home. They won the game by 22 points. The Philippines decided to retain ten players from the Chinese Taipei game for their next match, replacing Jio Jalalon and Allein Maliksi with Baser Amer and Carl Bryan Cruz. Australia suffered a 78-79 defeat to Japan prior to their second Philippines game but decided to retain the twelve players in their roster.

Closed door practice
Tensions were already running high between the Australia and Philippine teams prior to the start of the game. During their closed-door practice on 1 July 2018, the Australia team removed the decals of corporate sponsors PLDT and Chooks-to-Go on the court, reportedly due to player safety issues. Officials from the Philippine national basketball association, the Samahang Basketbol ng Pilipinas (SBP), criticized the move, stating that the Australians should have asked permission. Philippine head coach Chot Reyes said that the Australians removed the decals for being slippery and added that the decals were approved to use by FIBA, mentioning that SBP and FIBA officials were at the venue. Reyes, along with SBP official Manny V. Pangilinan, posted a video of the act through Twitter, expressing displeasure at the move and promising that they would "not back down" from the Australians.

Australia apologized for the incident and the SBP accepted the apology. However, the SBP maintained that the actions of the Australian side were unacceptable. The decals were restored two hours prior to tip-off.

Pre-game confrontations
During the pre-game warm-ups, Philippine players began crowding onto the Australian half of the court. Calvin Abueva, a member of the Philippine team, attempted to trip Australian player Daniel Kickert, who countered back by pushing and shoving another member of the Philippine team who he assumed was the culprit. A short confrontation between the two teams resulted thereafter, which had to be defused by the referees before the start of the match. Abueva admitted to trying to trip Kickert, but insisted that the Australians had been 'bullying' them even before he did so.

Match details
The Australians dominated the match, outscoring the Philippines in all three quarters played. The host was competitive against the visitors in the first quarter until Australia gained a 9-point lead by second quarter. The Philippines never recovered as Australia later achieved a double-digit lead against the hosts. Chris Goulding led the Australians in the scoring by contributing 20 points, while Andray Blatche led the Philippines with 12 points.

The three referees who officiated the match were Ahmed Al Bulushi of Oman, Hatim Alharbi of Saudi Arabia, and Paul Skayem of Lebanon. Jordanian official Fadi Adnan As’Ad Sabbah was the FIBA game commissioner.

Brawl

The Philippines was trailing 48–79 when the brawl began during the third quarter, with four minutes and one second left to play. Filipino player Roger Pogoy hit Australian player Chris Goulding with two hard fouls, one away from the play. Kickert, Goulding's teammate, retaliated by giving a similar hard foul to Pogoy with his elbow and forearm. Kickert's response caused Blatche and Jayson Castro to rush to retaliate. Other Filipino players from the bench rushed onto the court to join the brawl.

Blatche attempted to throw a punch against Kickert but was stopped by Australian player Thon Maker, who in turn was hit from behind by Filipino player Terrence Romeo. Team officials and spectators also got involved in the brawl. A separate incident involved Nathan Sobey, who was punched in the face by Jio Jalalon, a Filipino player who was not on the roster. Peter Aguilar, the father of Japeth Aguilar, threw a chair at Sobey.

At one point, Filipino players, officials and fans sitting at the court-side rushed in to hurt Goulding, who was lying on the floor defending himself. Philippine assistant coach Jong Uichico was seen punching and dropping a chair on Goulding. Filipino player Troy Rike came to Goulding's defence and stood over him to protect him from further attacks. Australian assistant coach Luc Longley intervened to clear away the people attacking Goulding and Sobey. Allein Maliksi, another Filipino player not part of the roster like Jalalon, also took part in the brawl.

Marc Pingris was criticized for taking a group selfie of himself and the rest of the Philippine team on-court after the brawl.

Match resumption and call off

The brawl caused a thirty-minute stoppage of the match. The referees along with security officials left the court and went to the OB Van of ESPN 5 outside the arena, which was covering the match, to review footage of the brawl from different camera angles. They returned to the court to announce sanctions.

Match officials ruled that thirteen players would be ejected before play was resumed. Officials ejected four Australian players and nine Filipino players, leaving the Philippine team with only three players. The match was resumed despite this, since FIBA rules state that play should continue as long as both teams have more than one player. June Mar Fajardo and Gabe Norwood, two of the three remaining Filipino players, intentionally fouled out, leaving Baser Amer as the last Filipino player on the court. The game was prematurely ended with one minute and fifty-seven seconds remaining in the third quarter.

Aftermath
The Philippines lost by default due to a lack of eligible players because of the ejection of nine of its players and two of the three remaining players intentionally fouling out. The Philippines ended its first round campaign with four wins and two defeats, both against Australia, settling for second place in Group B while Australia lost only one of its six games topping the group. Both teams advanced to the second round of the qualifiers.

Fearing for their own safety, the Australia team remained in the Philippine Arena for several hours after the match and changed hotels. A scheduled press conference at the Crowne Plaza Hotel in Pasig scheduled for 3 July 2018 was cancelled.

Reactions

Official statements by involved parties
Basketball Australia apologized for the brawl, accepting the Australia team's role in the incident but expressing concern for the involvement of officials and fans in the fight. The SBP apologized to Filipino fans and to the international basketball community for the brawl, saying that the incident "breached the bounds of traditional Filipino hospitality" and asserting that "violence has no place in sports". Both federations later issued a joint statement apologizing for the brawl and admitting full responsibility for the incident.

Other reactions
Australia's National Basketball League (NBL) said while the Australia team should accept consequences regarding the brawl, they also condemned players, officials, and fans of the Philippine team, stating what happened to the Australian side following the brawl was unacceptable. The SBP invited players of the Philippine team for a closed-door meeting scheduled on 5 July 2018 to discuss the incident, which could possibly impose its own fines and suspensions to players who were involved in the brawl. No similar actions as of late were to be seen from Basketball Australia.

Pingris' group selfie was criticized as insensitive but head coach Chot Reyes. Quinito Henson said that, based on how they knew Pingris personally, the selfie was an attempt to defuse tension. Reyes said that he would have stopped Pingris from taking the selfie given the circumstances.

According to Australia head coach Andrej Lemanis, the brawl may cause the U.S. National Basketball Association (NBA), which was already reluctant to release its players for the 2019 FIBA Basketball World Cup qualifiers, to hesitate even more about releasing its players for international play short of the FIBA Basketball World Cup or the 2020 Summer Olympics.

Further allegations

Closed-door practice sabotage
After the brawl-marred game, Australia's coach Andrej Lemanis accused the Philippines of sabotaging his side's training the day before the match. Lemanis then alleged that the people helping them in the court disappeared from the venue. He added that it was then that it became evident to his team that the court was unsafe to play on because of the way the decals were installed while reiterating Australia's early acknowledgement of not following the "correct process" in removing the decals. Lemanis said they decided to remove the decals due to time constraints caused by their limited practice time.

Racism
Alleged incidents of racism were raised after the brawl. Winston Baltasar, a Filipino freelance photographer covering the event, alleged that Australian players had used racial slurs against Filipinos during an interview at The Ticket, a radio program of Australia's Australian Broadcasting Corporation (ABC). He said that Filipino players had been called "monkeys". The Australian Basketballers' Association and Basketball Australia issued a joint statement calling Baltasar's remarks as "unsubstantiated and highly defamatory" and expressed disappointment with the ABC's decision to publish material relating to the remark. In an earlier interview on SportsCenter Philippines, Reyes said that he hadn't heard any incident of racist abuse by the Australian players.

Investigation
FIBA opened disciplinary proceedings against both Australia and the Philippines following the brawl. The referee of the match submitted statements and presented evidence to FIBA regarding the match and the brawl and both the basketball federations of Australia and the Philippines were given video copies recording the incident. Both Basketball Australia and the SBP were asked by FIBA to submit their own positions stating their sides regarding the brawl by 10 July 2018 but the deadline was later extended to midnight of 13 July 2018 (GMT+6).

Sanctions
Prior to the imposition of sanctions by FIBA, Al Panlilio of Samahang Basketbol ng Pilipinas (SBP) expressed hope that FIBA would view the incident as an isolated case and not affect the hosting rights of the Philippines for the 2023 FIBA Basketball World Cup. He also expected that both federations of Australia and the Philippines would be fined and that it would be a surprise if FIBA would choose to impose indefinite suspensions of the respective basketball federations of Australia and the Philippines. He pointed to the incident between Serbia and Greece in 2010 as a precedent for his expectation.

On 19 July, FIBA handed down their decision after conducting disciplinary investigation. Ten players from the Philippine basketball team, its coach Chot Reyes, and assistant coach Jong Uichico, as well as three players from Australia were given suspension from playing future games in the qualifiers (six games maximum). Reyes was suspended for a single match while Uichico was suspended for three games. According to the SBP, FIBA was clear that the ban imposed on the Philippine players does not apply to the national team's planned participation in the 2018 Asian Games in Indonesia, as well as their participation with their respective teams in the Philippine Basketball Association, and that the match suspensions were to be served in the 2019 FIBA World Cup qualifiers.

The Samahang Basketbol ng Pilipinas was fined CHF 250,000 for "unsportsmanlike behavior of its delegation members and of its public, as well as for insufficient organisation of the game" while Basketball Australia was fined CHF 100,000 for removing the court decals prior to the match. The fines will be used to fund FIBA's "Basketball for Good" program.

The Philippines played their next home court match behind closed doors (against Qatar on 17 September, at the Smart Araneta Coliseum in Quezon City, with media coverage), while a ban for two more home games as the country have been placed under a probationary period of three years. However, Samahang Basketball ng Pilipinas executive director Sonny Barrios stated if the behind-closed-doors game went well, the homecourt game ban can be possibly lifted and will be open for fans. The country's co-hosting of the 2023 FIBA World Cup is not affected by the sanctions.

The three referees who officiated the brawl-marred match also faced immediate removal from the FIBA Elite Program and suspension from officiating international competitions sanctioned or organized by FIBA for 1 year.

Summary
Player sanctions

Sanctions on officials

Sanctions on associations

Impact

2019 FIBA World Cup qualification
Both the Philippines and Australia managed to qualify for the 2019 FIBA Basketball World Cup in China. The Philippines was forced to revamp its roster for the September 2018 qualification window and Yeng Guiao was appointed as their head coach. The Philippines lost two matches at home in the November 2018 window to Iran and Kazakhstan threatening their bid to qualify for the World Cup. However they managed to secure qualification after winning their two matches away from home in the February 2019 window against Qatar and Kazakhstan. The Philippines qualified as the best fourth placer in the Asian qualifiers and had to rely on South Korea winning over Lebanon in the same qualification window.

First Round final standing  2019 FIBA Basketball World Cup qualification (Asia) – Group B

Second Round final standing  2019 FIBA Basketball World Cup qualification (Asia) – Group F

Philippines' Asian Games participation
The brawl played a part in the Philippines' withdrawal from the basketball competition of the 2018 Asian Games. Before the brawl incident, the Samahang Basketbol ng Pilipinas (SBP) planned to send a national team composed of the core of the TNT KaTropa of the Philippine Basketball Association. However such plan was cancelled after several players of the ball club along with naturalized player Andray Blatche got involved in the brawl. Though the player suspensions has no bearing in the Asian Games since the sanctions will be served in the next round of the FIBA Basketball World Cup qualifiers, the SBP decided not to include any of players suspended due to the brawl in the Philippines' Asian Games roster.

A plan was devised to send a national team composed of the core of the Rain or Shine Elasto Painters instead of TNT with NLEX Road Warriors coach Yeng Guiao to mentor the team. The Philippine Basketball Association officially announced the participation of Rain or Shine in the Asian Games on 26 July 2018 with the SBP declaring on the same day that the Philippine national team's withdrawal from the continental games saying that it and the national team intends "regroup, prepare for the process of appealing the FIBA Disciplinary Panel's recent decision, and aim for sustainable success in future tournaments."

The decision to withdraw was reversed on 5 August 2018 due to "clamor from fans".

2019 FIBA World Cup performance and further years
For the Philippines national team, the brawl became the start of a downward spiral. The Filipinos finished last at 32nd place during the World Cup in China, missing their chance of qualifying for the 2020 Summer Olympics, extending their Olympic basketball drought to 48 years. As a result, the Samahang Basketbol ng Pilipinas has chartered a new direction for the team leading up to their hosting of the 2023 FIBA Basketball World Cup and also in hopes of qualification to the 2024 Summer Olympics in Paris, which involves the development and international exposure of young players.

Australia went on to clinch the fourth-place spot at the World Cup. The Boomers also managed to qualify for the Olympics as the best Oceania team, where they won the bronze medal after defeating Slovenia.

The Philippine national team played at the Philippine Arena for the first time since the incident during the sixth window of the FIBA Basketball World Cup 2023 Asian Qualifiers, winning against Lebanon, 107–96, on February 24, 2023, and faced Jordan at the same venue on February 27.

See also
Pacers–Pistons brawl
List of violent spectator incidents in sports
Knicks–Nuggets brawl
Sparks–Shock brawl
2011 Crosstown Shootout brawl
Bonn–Bamberg basketball brawl

References

2019 FIBA Basketball World Cup
2018–19 in Philippine basketball
2018–19 in Australian basketball
2018 scandals
Basketball controversies
Philippines men's national basketball team
Australia men's national basketball team
Brawls in team sports
Basketball games in the Philippines
July 2018 sports events in Asia
Sports scandals in the Philippines
Sports scandals in Australia
Sports in Bulacan